Craig Wiggins (born 28 May 1999) is an Australian cyclist, who currently rides for UCI Continental team . He previously competed for UCI Continental team .

Career
Wiggins is a survivor of a hit-and-run accident that occurred while training.

At the 2022 Tour de Langkawi, he won the 2nd stage; this victory came 5 hours after the initial winner, Juan Sebastián Molano, was disqualified for an irregular sprint due to a hand infraction.

Major results
2017
 3rd Road race, Oceania Junior Road Championships
2022
 1st Stage 2 Tour de Langkawi

References

External links

Australian male cyclists
1999 births
Living people
People from Albany, Western Australia